Countess Anna Stepanovna Protasova (Анна Степановна Протасова; 1745–1826) was a lady-in-waiting and noblewoman who was a confidant of Empress Catherine the Great in the Russian Empire.

Life

She was the daughter of Senator Stepan Feodorovich Protasov and Anisya Nikitishna, née Orlova, and the cousin of Alexej Orlov with whom she is reported to have had a relationship. She was the foster parent of two girls  who were rumoured to have had Orlov as their biological father and either Catherine or Protasova as their biological mother.

Protasova replaced Countess Praskovya Bruce as Catherine's confidante and first maid-of-honour in 1779 and became lady-in-waiting in 1785. Catherine entrusted her with her most intimate personal affairs. Protasova is most known in history as l'éprouveuse for the role that she is supposed to have played in Catherine's love life. According to legend, she was to "test" the prospective lovers sexually before they became Catherine's lovers after they had been suggested by Potemkin, chosen by Catherine and examined by a doctor for venereal disease. The same role has been attributed without confirmation to her predecessor as lady-in-waiting, Praskovya Bruce. She accompanied Catherine on all of her journeys. Protasova is mentioned as l'éprouveuse in the poems of Byron.

In 1801, she was given the title of countess, and she remained lady-in-waiting to Empress Dowager Maria Feodorovna. Protasova died in St. Petersburg.

References 

 Simon Sebag-Montefiore : Potemkin och Katarina den stora (2005)
 Marie Tetzlaff : Katarina den stora (1998)

Countesses of the Russian Empire
Ladies-in-waiting from the Russian Empire
1745 births
18th-century people from the Russian Empire
1826 deaths
Burials at the Dukhovskaya Church
Court of Catherine the Great